Archipelago is the second album by the American group Land, who blend jazz, rock, and world music. A May, 1996 concert broadcast formed the basis for most of the album, Archipelago. "Deep", the final track for Archipelago, was recorded in February 1997, with finishing touches completed in July. The album was released on the Periplum label later that year.

Peter Monaghan, writing for Earshot Jazz magazine, describes Archipelago, in part: "LAND, on its second album, continues to construct transporting, otherworldly terrains of rich melody, washes of acoustic and electric sound, and pulsing and jangling rhythm. Add to that fine improv by all band members..."

Track listing
All songs composed by Land

 Deep - 9:10
 Motility - 9:59
 Quake - 7:54
 Stream - 7:55
 Hill - 7:27
 Kata - 6:30
 Frame - 5:13
 Tell - 8:11

Personnel
 Jeff Greinke - Keyboards, loops, effects, vocals, producer
 Lesli Dalaba - Percussion, trumpet
 Dennis Rea - Guitars
 George Soler - Stick, loops, effects
 Bill Moyer - Drums, percussion
 Greg Gilmore - Drums, percussion, loops, effects
 Ed Pias - Drums, percussion, vocal sample
 Doug Haire - Engineer

Notes

References
 CD Liner notes
 Allmusic [ Archipelago > Overview] Retrieved November 28, 2007.
 Discogs Archipelago Retrieved November 28, 2007.

External links
 Greinke, Jeff Jeff Greinke (LAND) - Archipelago

Land (band) albums
1997 live albums